Karel Sabbe (Waregem, 1989) is a Belgian ultrarunner.

Life 
Karel Sabbe is a professional dentist. During his youth and student days, he mainly played football and tennis. In 2014 he ran his first marathon. Without any background in running he participated in the Coast to Coast-race in New Zealand consisting of a 36 km trail run, 67 km kayaking and 140 km cycling.

This was followed by the Marathon des Sables (2016) in preparation for the Pacific Crest Trail (2016), where he finished 38th out of 1,200 starters. He eventually finished the 4,300 km long Pacific Crest Trail in 52 days, dethroning world record holder Joe McConaughy. He also smashed the record on the Appalachian Trail (2018), which was also previously held by Joe McConaughy, by more than 4 days. It took him 41 days. For both records he is listed in the Guinness Book of Records.

In the summer of 2020 he became the record holder on the Alta Via 2 in the Italian Dolomites. In October he became world champion Big's Backyard Ultra in a new world record of 75 laps (good for 502 km in 75 hours).

During the summer of 2021 he set the new speed record on the Via Alpina, a long-distance hiking trail through the Alps. He completed the red trail, the longest of the network, in 30 days, 8 hours and 40 minutes.

In 2023, Karel completed the Barkley Marathons in 59 hours, 53 minutes and 33 seconds. Effectively the slowest time of a finisher. He became the 17th finisher of the race.

During the Pacific Crest Trail, Appalachian Trail and the Barkley Marathons, he was logistically supported and guided by his brother-in-law and physiotherapist, Joren Biebuyck. During the Via Alpina record attempt, Joren was joined by friends of Karel.
 
In the city of Ghent, a hill was named after him, the Karel Sabbeberg, after Karel Sabbe climbed this hill a thousand times as a training.

Records 
2016 - Speed record of the Pacific Crest Trail 
2018 - Fastest Known Time (FKT) at the Appalachian Trail 
2020 - World Champion Big's Backyard Ultra (in a new world record - 75 laps for a total of 502 km) 
2021 - Fastest Known Time on the Via Alpina red trail 
2023 - Finisher of the Barkley Marathons

References

External links
 Official Website

Belgian athletes
1989 births
Living people